The National Nanotechnology Initiative (NNI) is a research and development initiative which provides a framework to coordinate nanoscale research and resources among United States federal government agencies and departments.

History 

Mihail C. Roco proposed the initiative in a 1999 presentation to the White House under the Clinton administration. The NNI was officially launched in 2000 and received funding for the first time in FY2001.

President Bill Clinton advocated nanotechnology development. In a 21 January 2000 speech  at the California Institute of Technology, Clinton stated that "Some of our research goals may take twenty or more years to achieve, but that is precisely why there is an important role for the federal government."

President George W. Bush further increased funding for nanotechnology.  On 3 December 2003 Bush signed into law the 21st Century Nanotechnology Research and Development Act, which authorizes expenditures for five of the participating agencies totaling $3.63 billion over four years..  This law is an authorization, not an appropriation, and subsequent appropriations for these five agencies have not met the goals set out in the 2003 Act. However, there are many agencies involved in the Initiative that are not covered by the Act, and requested budgets under the Initiative for all participating agencies in Fiscal Years 2006 – 2015 totaled over $1 billion each.

In February 2014, the National Nanotechnology Initiative released a Strategic Plan outlining updated goals and "program component areas" ," as required under the terms of the Act. This document supersedes the NNI Strategic Plans released in 2004 and 2007.

The NNI's budget supplement proposed by the Obama administration for Fiscal Year 2015 provides $1.5 billion in requested funding. The cumulative NNI investment since fiscal year 2001, including the 2015 request, totals almost $21 billion. Cumulative investments in nanotechnology-related environmental, health, and safety research since 2005 now total nearly $900 million. The Federal agencies with the largest investments are the National Institutes of Health, National Science Foundation, Department of Energy, Department of Defense, and the National Institute of Standards and Technology.

The NNI cumulative investment by 2021 inclusive reached $36 billion, and nanotechnology has become pervasive in material, energy and biosystem related applications (https://www.tvworldwide.net/NNI-Retrospective/VideoId/2111/nni-retrospective-video-creating-a-national-initiative-trailer-3-min).

Goals 
The four primary goals of NNI are:

 Advance a world-class nanotechnology research and development program;
 Foster the transfer of new technologies into products for commercial and public benefits;
 Develop and sustain educational resources, a skilled workforce, and a dynamic infrastructure and toolset to advance nanotechnology;
 Support responsible development of nanotechnology.

Initiatives

Nanotechnology Signature Initiatives 
Nanotechnology Signature Initiatives (NSIs) spotlight areas of nanotechnology where significant advances in nanoscale science and technology can be made with the focus and cooperation of participating agencies. NSIs accelerate research, development, and application of nanotechnology in these critical areas.

As of December 2020, the current NSIs are:

 NSI: Water Sustainability through Nanotechnology – Nanoscale Solutions for a Global-Scale Challenge,
 NSI: Nanotechnology for Sensors and Sensors for Nanotechnology – Improving and Protecting Health, Safety, and the Environment,
 NSI: Sustainable Nanomanufacturing - Creating the Industries of the Future,
 NSI: Nanoelectronics for 2020 and Beyond.

NSIs are dynamic and are retired as they achieve their specified goals or develop an established community they no longer require the spotlight provided as a NSI. Retired NSIs are:

 NSI: Nanoelectronics for 2020 and Beyond,
 NSI: Nanotechnology for Solar Energy Collection and Conversion - Contributing to Energy Solutions for the Future,
 NSI: Nanotechnology Knowledge Infrastructure - Enabling National Leadership in Sustainable Design.

Nanotechnology-Inspired Grand Challenges 
A nanotechnology-inspired grand challenge (GC) is an ambitious goal that utilizes nanotechnology and nanoscience to solve national and global issues. The first and current GC was announced in October 2015 after receiving input and suggestions from the public. As of December 2020, the grand challenge is:

 A Nanotechnology-Inspired Grand Challenge for Future Computing: Create a new type of computer that can proactively interpret and learn from data, solve unfamiliar problems using what it has learned, and operate with the energy efficiency of the human brain.

Participating Federal Agencies and Departments 
Departments and agencies with nanotechnology R&D budgets:

Other participating departments and agencies:

See also 
 National Science and Technology Council
 President's Council of Advisors on Science and Technology
 Translational research

References

External links
 
 

Nanotechnology institutions
Government research